The Fiji Islands Council of Trade Unions (FICTU) was established in August, 2002 as a breakaway from and rival to the FTUC.

Fifteen unions, which were formerly affiliated to the FTUC, initially joined the new umbrella organisation. The move follows the unions’ disatissfaction with the FTUC led by Senator Felix Anthony, which they see as too closely linked with the Labour Party. The FICTU is led by Maika Namudu, of the Fijian Teachers Association, as president and Attar Singh, of the Fiji Aviation Workers Association, as general secretary. Mr Namudu claimed that the new body was not politically motivated but the former Minister for Labour, Kenneth Zinck, an opponent of the Labour Party, described the launch of the new trade union body as a breath of fresh air for workers in the country.

In early October 2018 the FICTU announced its decision to rejoin the FTUC, which will formally happen on 27 October 2018.

References

Trade unions in Fiji
Trade unions established in 2002
Trade unions disestablished in 2018